A list of books and essays about Peter Jackson and his films:

Individual films

King Kong

The Lord of the Rings Trilogy

Jackson